Miss World USA 1971 was the 10th edition of the Miss World USA pageant and it was held in the Hampton Roads Coliseum in Hampton, Virginia and was won by Karen Brucene Smith of Texas. She was crowned by outgoing titleholder, Sandra Wolsfeld of Illinois. Smith went on to represent the United States at the Miss World 1971 Pageant in London later that year. She finished as 5th Runner-Up at Miss World. She later won Miss American Beauty 1974 (Miss U.S. International 1974) and competed in and later won Miss International 1974.

Results

Placements

Special awards

Delegates
The Miss World USA 1971 delegates were:

 Alabama - Mary E. Sims
 Alaska - Paula Lynn Slaymaker
 Arizona - Lindsay Diane Bloom
 Arkansas - Peggy Kay Hutchens
 California - Darlene Poole
 Colorado - Juliet B. Race
 Connecticut - Brenda Sue Flowers
 Delaware - Linda Marie Miller
 District of Columbia - Melissa Jane Bridgewater
 Florida -  Anita L. Senno
 Georgia - Deborah Kay Cunningham
 Idaho - Jackie Bean
 Illinois - Leah Anderson
 Indiana - Claudette Booth
 Iowa - Beverly Meyer Vratny
 Kentucky - Anne Wright
 Louisiana - Judy Cusimano
 Maine - Allison Lee Cook
 Maryland - Gail Somerville
 Massachusetts - Colette C. Nourey
 Michigan - Gwen Marie Humble
 Minnesota - Carolyn Schmidt
 Mississippi - Seletha Ann Jarreau
 Missouri - Nancy Lee Swain
 Montana - Joli Fanyak
 Nebraska - Staci Ann Lieb
 Nevada - Jennifer Marie Swan
 New Hampshire - Jane Floren
 New Jersey - Elizabeth Wanderman
 New Mexico - Jo Ann Howell
 New York - Susan Elizabeth Dishaw
 North Carolina - Terri Lee Horn
 North Dakota - Estrella Maria Petil
 Ohio - Shirley Malin
 Oregon - Cynthia Leann Hager
 Pennsylvania - Maria Elena Alberici
 Rhode Island - Judith Ann Gendron
 South Carolina - Debra Carol Cooper
 South Dakota - Katherine Ann Wessel
 Tennessee - Deborah Barnett
 Texas - Karen Brucene Smith
 Utah - Iris Kay Betts
 Vermont - Jeanne A. Whipple
 Virginia - Carolyn Rea Martin
 Washington - Sharon Lynne Conrad
 West Virginia - Kathy Redosh
 Wisconsin - Lynn Marie Mathey
 Wyoming - Cody Kay Armitage

Notes

Did not Compete

Crossovers
Contestants who competed in other beauty pageants:

Miss USA
1969: : Elizabeth Wanderman (Top 15; as )

Miss International
1972: : Lindsay Diane Bloom (4th Runner-Up; as )
1974: : Karen Brucene Smith (Winner; as )

References

External links
Miss World Official Website
Miss World America Official Website

1971 in the United States
World America
1971
1971 in Virginia
Hampton, Virginia